McDougall or McDougal (see also MacDougall) is a common Scottish surname that can refer to several people, places and things.

People named McDougall
Alexander McDougall, American privateer, merchant, and revolutionary leader
Barbara McDougall, former Canadian Secretary of State for External Affairs
Charles McDougall, British television director
Christopher McDougall, American author
Colin McDougall, Canadian author
Dan McDougall, award-winning Scottish human-rights journalist
David McDougall (footballer) (1894–1918), Scottish footballer
Donnie McDougall, Canadian musician
Frances Harriet Whipple Green McDougall, nineteenth-century American author, abolitionist, and feminist
Francine McDougall, Australian director and photographer.
Gordon McDougall, Australian actor
Harriette McDougall, British missionary in Malaysia
James McDougall (explorer), nineteenth-century Canadian explorer of British Columbia
James A. McDougall, nineteenth-century American politician from California
Jimmy McDougall, Scottish lawyer
John McDougall (disambiguation), list of people with the name
Kevin McDougall, a fictional guardian with paired revolvers
Marshall McDougall, American baseball player
Sophia McDougall, British author, playwright, and poet
Stanley Robert McDougall, Australian recipient of the Victoria Cross
Walt McDougall, (1858–1938), American cartoonist 
William McDougall (disambiguation), list of people with the name

People named McDougal
Amy McDougal, fictional character in a Scottish television series
David McDougal, naval officer in the American Civil War
Dennis McDougal, American biographer
Donald McDougal, Canadian politician representing the Ontario provincial electoral district of Ottawa East 1908–1911
Francis McDougal, nineteenth-century Canadian politician from Ontario
Karen McDougal, American actor and model
Jim McDougal, a figure in the American Whitewater controversy of the 1990s
Susan McDougal, a figure in the American Whitewater controversy of the 1990s
James McDougal Hart, American painter
Milton McDougal, American farmer and politician

Places and things
McDougal, Arkansas, United States of America
McDougall, Ontario, Canada
McDougall Hill, a street in Edmonton, Canada, named after the hill it runs on
McDougall Hospital, U.S. Army Hospital in the Bronx during the American Civil War.
USS McDougal, two ships of the United States Navy, named for David McDougal
Rank Hovis McDougall, or RHM, a British food manufacturer

See also
Robert McDouall
John McDouall Stuart

Anglicised Scottish Gaelic-language surnames
Patronymic surnames
Surnames from given names